East Montlake Park is a park in the Montlake neighborhood of Seattle, Washington, USA. The park is bounded on the north by the Montlake Cut, on the east by Union Bay, on the south by Washington State Route 520, and on the west by East Park Drive E.

The 1971 Montlake Cut Waterside Trail runs through the park past the 40-foot totem pole shown at right on its way to West Montlake Park. A plaque at the bottom of the totem pole states that it was carved in 1937 by John Dewey Wallace, a Haida chief, in Waterfall, Alaska. The dedication ceremony for the donated totem pole took place in May 1983.

Before construction of the Evergreen Point Floating Bridge replacement, McCurdy Park, formerly home to the Museum of History and Industry, existed to the south and east.

External links
 East Montlake Park at Seattle Parks and Recreation

Parks in Seattle
Montlake, Seattle